Gunnera hamiltonii is a creeping herbaceous plant in the family Gunneraceae, with clusters of small (2 to 7 cm) grey-brown leaves forming a dense mat. Small green flowers are followed by red berries in the autumn.

It is one of the rarest plants in its native New Zealand, with Southland and Stewart Island/Rakiura representing two of the suspected 5 remaining natural habitats. Natural fertilisation of these plants is now difficult as the male and female plants are separate.

References

External links

 Environment Southland factsheet - see sidebar
 Photo of cultivated Gunnera hamiltonii
 New Zealand Duneland Ecology - includes photo of wild Gunnera hamiltonii

Flora of New Zealand
Endangered flora of New Zealand
hamiltonii